Sierck-les-Bains (Lorraine Franconian: Siirk/Siirck) is a commune in the Moselle department in Grand Est in north-eastern France.
Localities of the commune: Rudling, Kœnigsberg (German: Rudlingen, Königsberg)

Language Revitalization 
Sierck-Les-Bains and other municipalities in the Moselle Department of France have attempted some limited projects to protect and revitalize the declining Lorraine-Franconian dialects which were historically spoken in the region. The dialect historically spoken in Sierck is closely related to the Saarländisch dialects and Luxembourgish due to the village’s proximity to the German and Luxembourg borders. Sierck has put up road signs with the Lorraine Franconian name “Siirk” as well as street names in Lorraine Franconian. Such attempts to revitalize the Lorraine Franconian language has also been replicated in other municipalities in the Moselle department such as Hettange-Grande.

See also 
 Communes of the Moselle department

References

External links 
 

Siercklesbains
Three Bishoprics